John Brydges, Marquess of Carnarvon (15 January 1703 – 7 April 1727), styled Viscount Wilton from 1714 to 1719, was a British Member of Parliament, heir apparent to the Duke of Chandos.

John was the fourth, but eldest surviving son of James Brydges, 1st Duke of Chandos and his first wife Mary. He was educated at Westminster School, from which he graduated in 1718. Viscount Wilton, as he then was, matriculated at University of Oxford on 4 November 1719, from which he received a Doctor of Civil Law on 8 April 1721. He also studied at Leyden that year. Carnarvon completed his education with a Grand Tour of Europe from 1721 to 1723.

After his return to England, he married Lady Catherine Tollemache, daughter of Lionel Tollemache, 3rd Earl of Dysart, on 1 September 1724. The couple had two children:
Lady Catherine Brydges (17 December 1725 – 16 May 1807), married first Capt. William Berkeley Lyon and second Edwyn Francis Stanhope, by the latter of whom she was mother of Sir Henry Edwyn Stanhope, 1st Baronet
Lady Jane Brydges (28 April 1727 – 1 March 1776), married James Brydges of Pinner, without issue

Carnarvon was returned on his father's electoral interest for the constituency of Steyning in January 1726, at a by-election following the death of John Pepper. However, he died in April 1727 of smallpox. His place was filled by William Stanhope, lately Ambassador to Spain.

References

1703 births
1727 deaths
British courtesy marquesses
British MPs 1722–1727
John
Deaths from smallpox
Heirs apparent who never acceded
Members of the Parliament of Great Britain for English constituencies
People educated at Westminster School, London